Mycterus umbellatarum is a species of soft wing flower beetle in the family Mycteridae. It occurs in Europe and North Africa.

Distribution
This species is present in part of Central and Southern Europe (Germany, Greece, Italy, Portugal, Spain and Switzerland) and in North Africa.

Description
These beetles are rather variable in size and colour. This species is similar to Mycterus curculioides and Mycterus tibialis. They can be distinguished by the length and thickness of rostrum.

References

J. Bergsten, G. Lindberg, H. Vardal, N. Apelquist, Y. Brodin and M. Forshage - Arbetet med donationer av insektsamlingar vid Naturhistoriska Riksmuseet
Darren Pollock - Three new species of Mycterus Clairville (Coleoptera: Mycteridae) from sub-Saharan Africa - African Entomology, 1997

External links
 Mycterus umbellatarum - Biodiversity Heritage Library 

Tenebrionoidea
Beetles of Europe
Beetles described in 1781